KCOX (1350 AM, "1350 News/Talk") is a radio station broadcasting a news talk information format. Licensed to Jasper, Texas, United States, the station is currently owned by Cross Texas Media and features programming from Fox News Radio, Premiere Radio Networks and Westwood One.

KCOX is a member of The Texas Association of Broadcasters.

References

External links

COX
News and talk radio stations in the United States
Radio stations established in 1964